The Australian Entomologist is a peer-reviewed scientific journal published quarterly by the Entomological Society of Queensland. The editor in chief is David Hancock. It was established in 1974 as The Australian Entomological Magazine and obtained its current title in 1993.

See also 
 Australian Journal of Entomology

External links 
 

Entomology journals and magazines
Publications established in 1974
Quarterly journals
English-language journals
Academic journals published by learned and professional societies